Het Rattenkasteel ("The Rat's Castle") was a 1984 opera adaptation of the comic book album Het Rattenkasteel from The Adventures of Nero series by Marc Sleen. It was directed by Arne Sierens, composed by Johan De Smet and under musical direction of Vincent D'Hondt.

The work was performed by the theatre group "De Sluipende Armoede" and actors such as Marc van Malderen, Guido Naessens, Lieven Deroo, Martien De Craene, and others. The masks and costumes were provided by Erik De Volder. The stage was designed by Bert Vervaet.

History

The idea to adapt an album of The Adventures of Nero for opera came about when Sierens and De Smet were having a drink. They decide to create it in four months time, much like Wolfgang Amadeus Mozart used to do, and, inspired by a manifest by George Antheil, decided to keep it short and simple. Sierens wrote the libretto in four weeks time. The rehearsals started while De Smet was still composing the score. The entire ouverture was completed at the night of the final rehearsal. Marc Sleen created the poster.

The work was performed in an avant-garde style, complete with percussion and diamond blades as musical accompaniment. The arias were pastiches of various musical styles, including film music, schlager, rock music and traditional African music. It opened on July 14, 1984 and had two extra performances on July 20 and 21 of that same year. The general public enjoyed it, but professional critics disliked it and compared it to a school play.

Cast
 Nero: Marc Van Malderen 
 Detective Van Zwam: Lieven De Roo
 Madame Blanche: Martien De Craene
 Dr. Ratsjenko: Guido Naessens
 Minor roles: Greet Devos, Simon André, Danny Galle, Dirk Opstaele, Ann Bellemans and Brigitte Louveaux.

References in Nero

Marc Sleen referenced the opera in The Adventures of Nero story "Het Achtste Wereldwonder" ("The Eighth Wonder of the World") (1995–1996), where in strip 91 mention is made of a gang who call themselves "De Sluipende Armoede", which was the name of Sierens' theatre company.

Sources

Dutch-language operas
1984 operas
Opéras comiques
Minimalist operas
Operas set in Belgium
Operas based on comics
The Adventures of Nero
Operas